8×50mmR may refer to:
 8×50R Lebel, a cartridge using smokeless powder
 8×50mmR Mannlicher, a cartridge of Austria-Hungary from 1890